S65 may refer to:

Automobiles 
 BMW S65, an automobile engine
 Daihatsu Hijet (S65), a Japanese kei truck
 Mercedes-Benz S65 AMG, a sedan
 S-65 Stalinets, a Soviet tractor

Other uses 
 S65 (Esko Prague), a commuter rail line in the Czech Republic
 Darkinjung language
 
 , a submarine of the Indian Navy
 Savoia-Marchetti S.65, an Italian racing seaplane
 Siemens S65, a mobile phone
 Sikorsky S-65, a family of heavy-lift transport helicopters
 S65, a postcode district in Rotherham, England